The 1960 United States presidential election in Florida was held on November 8, 1960. All contemporary fifty states took part, and Florida voters selected 10 electors to the Electoral College, who voted for president and vice president.

Vote
Republican candidate Richard Nixon won against John F. Kennedy by 46,776 votes and by 3.02%. As of the 2020 presidential election, this is the last election in which Escambia County, Clay County, Okaloosa County, and Santa Rosa County voted for a Democratic presidential candidate. This was the first time that a Democrat was elected without winning Florida.  It was also the first time since 1924 that Florida failed to vote for the winner of the presidential election. This has since happened only twice, in 1992 and 2020.

Results

Results by county

References 

Florida
1960 Florida elections
1960